José Luis Torrijo (born 9 February 1967) is a Spanish theatre, television and film actor. His most acclaimed film performance is his role in Solitary Fragments for which he won the Goya Award for Best New Actor.

Biography 
José Luis Torrijo was born on 9 February 1967 in San Sebastián.

His stage credits include performances in plays of Fuente Ovejuna, Viaje del Parnaso, El sueño de una noche de verano, La Celestina (Sempronio), La amante inglesa, Blackbird, Bailar en la oscuridad.

He made his television debut in an episode of the series . His early film career was marked by minor roles in films such as Airbag, All About My Mother, The Devil's Backbone and Pan's Labyrinth. His performance in Jaime Rosales' film Solitary Fragments—in which he played the role of Pedro, the former husband of Adela (Sonia Almarcha)— earned him the Goya Award for Best New Actor at the 22nd Goya Awards.

Filmography

Film

Television

Accolades

References 

20th-century Spanish male actors
21st-century Spanish male actors
Spanish male stage actors
Spanish male film actors
Spanish male television actors
1967 births
Living people